Loddon and Clavering Rural District was a rural district in Norfolk, England from 1894 to 1935., continuing, with very slight boundary changes, as Loddon Rural District until 1974.

It was formed under the Local Government Act 1894 based on the Loddon and Clavering rural sanitary district, and took its name from the ancient hundreds of Loddon and Clavering. It lay in the south-east corner of the county.

In 1974, the district was abolished under the Local Government Act 1972, and became part of the South Norfolk district.

Statistics

Parishes

References

Districts of England created by the Local Government Act 1894
Districts of England abolished by the Local Government Act 1972
Historical districts of Norfolk
Rural districts of England